Brookside Township is one of fifteen townships in Clinton County, Illinois, USA. As of the 2010 census, its population was 5,503 and it contained 1,700 housing units. The township's name changed from Crooked Creek Township on June 1, 1874.

Geography

Cities, towns, villages
 Centralia (west quarter)
 Wamac (northwest quarter)

Cemeteries

 Barker
 Chambers
 Garrison
 Gilmore
 Jolliff
 Jones
 Petrea

Major highways
  Illinois Route 161

Airports and landing strips
 Centralia Correctional Center Heliport

Landmarks
 Fairview Park
 Warren G Murray Developmental Center

Demographics

School districts
 Carlyle Community Unit School District 1

Political districts
 Illinois's 19th congressional district
 State House District 107
 State Senate District 54

References
 
 US Census Bureau 2007 TIGER/Line Shapefiles
 US National Atlas

External links
 City-Data.com
 Illinois State Archives

Townships in Clinton County, Illinois
Townships in Illinois